Hasan Babay (born 1 June 1992) is a Somali international footballer. During the early 2010s, Babay played for the Somali under-23 team. Since the mid-2010s, Babay has been acting as a spokesperson with regards to the strategy of the Somali national football team. At club level, Babay has solely represented local Somali clubs, particularly as a defender for Elman FC; he cited insecurity concerns during the mid-2010s stint. He has served as the captain of the Somali national team since the mid-2010s, becoming the longest continuously serving Somali player to do so.

References

1986 births
Living people
Somalian footballers
Somalia international footballers
Somalian expatriate footballers
Association football defenders
Elman FC players